The Green Algae of North America is an influential early book on American green algae written by algologist Frank Shipley Collins. It was published in 1909 by Tufts College.

References

External links
Biodiversitylibrary.org: The Green Algae of North America — on the Biodiversity Heritage Library
The green algae of North America, 1909, Hathi Trust Digital Library

Botany books
Green algae
Botany in North America
1909 non-fiction books